The Commonwealth Secretariat is the main intergovernmental agency and central institution of the Commonwealth of Nations.  It is responsible for facilitating co-operation between members; organising meetings, including the Commonwealth Heads of Government Meetings (CHOGM); assisting and advising on policy development; and providing assistance to countries in implementing the decisions and policies of the Commonwealth.

The Secretariat has observer status in the United Nations General Assembly. It is located at Marlborough House in London, the United Kingdom, a former royal residence that was given by Queen Elizabeth II, Head of the Commonwealth at the time.

History

The Secretariat was established by Heads of Government in 1965, taking over many of the functions of the United Kingdom Government's Commonwealth Relations Office, as part of a major shake-up of the organisation of the Commonwealth.  At the same time, the United Kingdom succeeded in advocating the creation of the Secretariat's sister organisation, the Commonwealth Foundation, which was founded to foster non-governmental relations and the promotion of the Commonwealth Family network of civil societies. Other attempts by members to create similar central bodies, such as a medical conference (proposed by New Zealand), a development bank (Jamaica), and an institution for satellite communications (Canada) failed.

The creation of the Secretariat itself was a contentious issue.  The United Kingdom and other long-established countries had hoped to slow the tide of expansion of Commonwealth membership to prevent the dilution of their traditional power within the Commonwealth (particularly after the admission of Cyprus). This may have involved a dual-tiered Commonwealth, requiring the continuation of the organisation of Commonwealth co-operation by meetings, rather than a central administration.  However, the new African members were keener to create an independent inter-governmental 'central clearing house' (as Ghana's Kwame Nkrumah described it) to remove power from the older dominions. Milton Obote of Uganda was the first to propose a specifically titled 'secretariat', which was then formally proposed by Eric Williams of Trinidad and Tobago, who wished to see it based upon the secretariats of the OAS, EEC, and OAU.

Earlier attempts at the formation of a central secretariat had been made and failed. Australia had proposed the establishment four times (in 1907, 1924, 1932, and 1944), whilst New Zealand had also made proposals in 1909 and 1956.

Staff
The chief executive of the Secretariat, and of the Commonwealth as a whole, is the Commonwealth Secretary-General. All Secretariat staff report to the secretary-general, who is also responsible for spending the Secretariat's budget, which is granted by the Heads of Government. It is the secretary-general, and not the ceremonial Head of the Commonwealth, that represents the Commonwealth publicly. The secretary-general is elected by the Heads of Government at the Commonwealth Heads of Government meetings for terms of four years; previously, until 2000, a term was five years. The current Secretary-General is Dominica's Patricia Scotland, who replaced Kamalesh Sharma as Secretary-General on 1 April 2016.

The secretary-general is assisted by three deputy secretaries-general: one responsible for economic affairs (currently Deodat Maharaj), one for political affairs (Josephine Ojiambo), and one for corporate affairs (Gary Dunn). The secretary-general may appoint junior staff at his own discretion, provided the Secretariat can afford it, whilst the more senior staff may be appointed only from a shortlist of nominations from the Heads of Government. In practice, the secretary-general has more power than this; member governments consult the secretary-general on nominations, and the secretary-general has also at times submitted nominations of his own.

All members of staff are exempt from income tax, under the International Organisations Act 2005, which redefined the legal status of the Secretariat.

Headquarters
The Secretariat is headquartered at Marlborough House, in London, the United Kingdom. Marlborough House is located on Pall Mall, Westminster, next to St. James's Palace, which is formally the location of the British Royal Court. Marlborough House was previously a royal residence in its own right, but was given by Queen Elizabeth II, the former Head of the Commonwealth, to the British government in September 1959 for use for Commonwealth purposes. This was first realised three years later. Another three years later, in 1965, the building passed to the Secretariat upon its foundation. The building itself was designed by Sir Christopher Wren and served as the London residence of the dukes of Marlborough until it was given to Princess Charlotte in 1817.

The Commonwealth Secretariat Act 1966, which applied retroactively from the establishment of the Secretariat in 1965, first granted the organisation full diplomatic immunity. This has been subjected to a number of lawsuits challenging this, including Mohsin v Commonwealth Secretariat, and in 2005, Sumukan Limited v Commonwealth Secretariat. The 1966 Act had been interpreted by English courts as allowing the courts to exercise supervisory jurisdiction under the Arbitration Act 1996 over the Commonwealth's arbitration tribunal, which had been envisaged as the sole organ to arbitrate on matters related to the Secretariat's operations in the United Kingdom. In light of this interpretation, the Commonwealth Secretariat Act was amended by the International Organisations Act 2005, which gave the Commonwealth Secretariat Arbitral Tribunal the same legal immunity as the Secretariat itself, guaranteeing independence of the English courts.

See also
 Commonwealth Foundation
 Commonwealth Youth Programme

Footnotes

External links
 Commonwealth Secretariat official website

 
1965 establishments in the United Kingdom
Secretariat
International organisations based in London
Organizations established in 1965
Commonwealth
United Nations General Assembly observers